The 2014 Eastern Washington Eagles football team represented Eastern Washington University in the 2014 NCAA Division I FCS football season. The team was coached by Beau Baldwin, who was in his seventh season with Eastern Washington. The Eagles played their home games at Roos Field in Cheney, Washington and were a member of the Big Sky Conference. They finished the season 11–3, 7–1 in Big Sky to become Big Sky Conference champions. They received the conference's automatic bid to the FCS Playoffs where they defeated fellow Big Sky member Montana in the second round before losing in the quarterfinals to Illinois State.

Schedule

Source: Official Schedule

Despite also being a member of the Big Sky Conference, the game with Montana State on September 20 is considered a non conference game.

Game summaries

Sam Houston State
Sources:

Montana Western
Sources:

Washington
Sources:

Montana State
Sources:

UC Davis
Sources:

Idaho State
Sources:

Southern Utah
Sources:

Northern Colorado
Sources:

Northern Arizona
Sources:

North Dakota
Sources:

Montana
Sources:

Portland State
Sources:

FCS Playoffs

FCS Playoffs Second Round
Sources:

FCS Playoffs Quarterfinals
Sources:

Ranking movements

References

Eastern Washington
Eastern Washington Eagles football seasons
Big Sky Conference football champion seasons
Eastern Washington
Eastern Washington Eagles football